Killiana Heymans (born 24 January 1997) is a Dutch athlete specialising in the pole vault. She represented her country at the 2019 World Championships in Doha without qualifying for the final. In addition, she finished fourth at the 2019 European U23 Championships.

Her personal bests in the event are 4.51 metres outdoors (Cologne 2019) and 4.46 metres indoors (Sandnes 2019).

International competitions

References

1997 births
Living people
Dutch female pole vaulters
World Athletics Championships athletes for the Netherlands
Dutch Athletics Championships winners
21st-century Dutch women